François Lejeune may refer to:
Jean Effel (1908–1982, real name François Lejeune), French painter, caricaturist, illustrator and journalist
Louis-François Lejeune (1775–1848), French general, painter, and lithographer